Cwmavon may refer to:

 Cwmavon, Torfaen, a small village in Monmouthshire, Wales
 Cwmavon, Neath Port Talbot, a large village in Wales
 Cwmavon RFC, a rugby union club based in Cwmavon, Wales